The common nutmeg, Cancellaria reticulata, is a species of medium-sized to large sea snail, a marine gastropod mollusk in the family Cancellariidae, the nutmeg snails.

Distribution
This species lives in the western Atlantic Ocean from North Carolina to Brazil, in the Caribbean Sea, the Gulf of Mexico and the Lesser Antilles.

Habitat
The common nutmeg lives in offshore waters. The empty shell is occasionally washed onto ocean beaches.

Life habits
This species is probably carnivorous because its radula is ideal for feeding on soft-bodied animals. The life habits of this species are not known, but one species (Cancellaria cooperi) in the same family is an external parasite on rays.

Shell description
The shell of this species grows up to 2.5 inches in length. It has a rough surface with many spiral cords crossing many axial ribs, resulting in a lattice or beaded pattern. The aperture is elongate, with a short canal. The inner margin with two strong, thin spiral ridges running into its aperture (the upper ridge is stronger than the lower ridge).

There is no operculum.

The common nutmeg's coloration is banded or splotched with tints of cream and orange or brown.

References

 Abbott, R. Tucker, 1986. Seashells of North America, St. Martin's Press, New York
 Common Nutmeg
 NC Sea Grant
 Petit, R.E. & Harasewych, M.G. (2005) Catalogue of the superfamily Cancellarioidea Forbes and Hanley, 1851 (Gastropoda: Prosobranchia)- 2nd edition. Zootaxa, 1102, 3-161. NIZT 682
 Hemmen J. (2007). Recent Cancellariidae. Wiesbaden, 428pp.
 Rosenberg, G., F. Moretzsohn, and E. F. García. 2009. Gastropoda (Mollusca) of the Gulf of Mexico, Pp. 579–699 in Felder, D.L. and D.K. Camp (eds.), Gulf of Mexico–Origins, Waters, and Biota. Biodiversity. Texas A&M Press, College Station, Texas.

External links
 The Bailey-Matthews Shell Museum entry at: 

Cancellariidae
Gastropods described in 1767
Taxa named by Carl Linnaeus